Varfell is a hamlet within the parish of Ludgvan, Cornwall, UK. Varfell Farm is the world's largest producers of daffodil bulbs.

History
In 1882 the Penzance Rural Sanitary Authority agreed to supply Mr Lawry  daily for the greenhouses, on the condition that if there was a shortage the supply would be diverted to Marazion and St Michael's Mount. The annual rate of payment was £6. Varfell is now one the centres of production for the large flower and bulb growers Winchester Bulbs.

Famous people
Varfell was the ancestral home of chemist Humphry Davy.

References

 

Penwith
Hamlets in Cornwall